Queen Charlotte was built in Ireland in 1770 but did not appear in British online records until 1786. She made two voyages as a slave ship in the triangular trade in enslaved people. She was sold in Barbados in 1793 after delivering her slaves from her second voyage.

Career
Queen Charlotte first appeared in Lloyd's Register (LR) in 1786, having been almost rebuilt in 1785.

1st enslaving voyage (1789–1791): Captain William Newton sailed from Bristol on 21 November 1789. She gathered her captives at Anomabu and arrived with 74 captives at Jamaica. She sailed from Jamaica on 26 January 1791 and arrived back at Bristol on 28 April.

2nd enslaving voyage (1792–1793): Captain John George sailed from Bristol 23 June 1792. She gathered her slaves at Anomabu and sailed from Cape Coast Castle on 28 August 1793. She had taken on 44 grown males, 25 grown females, and one male under . One woman died on the voyage. At some point J.Roach became master of Queen Charlotte.

Fate: The vessel was reported sold at Barbados.

Citations

References
 

1770 ships
Ships built in Ireland
Age of Sail merchant ships of England
Bristol slave ships